The Battle of the Bay of Biscay, or Operation Bernau, was a naval action that took place on 28 December 1943 during World War II as part of the Atlantic campaign. The battle took place in the Bay of Biscay between two light cruisers of the British Royal Navy, and a destroyer and a torpedo boat flotilla of the German Kriegsmarine hoping to intercept and escort a blockade runner. The battle was fought as part of the Allied Operation Stonewall, which was to intercept German blockade runners off the west coast of France. In the confused action that followed the two British cruisers  and   respectively sank T26, together with her sister ship T25 and the destroyer Z27.

Background 
In late December 1943 a German Kriegsmarine destroyer flotilla, reinforced by six large Elbing-class torpedo boats, was ordered to the Bay of Biscay in order to escort into a French port the blockade runners Osorno and Alsterufer, which were carrying vital cargo from Japan. The Germans codenamed this Operation Bernau. The blockade runner Osorno reached the Gironde on 26 December, but struck a wreck in the estuary after being attacked by the RAF. She was beached and subsequently unloaded offshore. Meanwhile, Alsterufer, carrying tungsten (Wolfram) and rubber, was still much further behind.

Korvettenkapitän Franz Kohlauf sailed from Brest on the morning of 27 December with the torpedo boats T23, T24,  and T22.

The British Admiralty were also aware of the impending arrival of Alsterufer through the decryption of German Enigma messages at Bletchley Park and sent out dispatches to the nearest ships in the area for the interception. In support, but further away;  had been ordered out from Gibraltar;  steamed past Lisbon; and HMNZS Gambia was in the Western Atlantic.

By 04:00 the next day the 4th Flotilla was 300 miles due south of Cape Clear, the 8th Flotilla standing to the south, and were ready to meet Alsterufer. She was however nowhere to be seen. The German flotillas were completely unaware that during the previous afternoon a B-24 Liberator bomber of No. 311 (Czechoslovak) Squadron RAF had attacked and set Alsterufer on fire. Abandoned by her crew, the ship was finished off by Liberators of No. 86 Squadron. This released the Glasgow and Enterprise, who were some 300 nautical miles south-west of the German forces and were now steaming eastwards along the 45th Parallel.

Just after midday, Erdmenger's 8th Destroyer Flotilla sighted Kohlauf's 4th Flotilla to the east, whereupon the torpedo boats turned east astern of the northernmost destroyers, taking station on their port side.

Battle 

Allied aircraft had already reported the position of the German ships about 1300. About the same time a lone German Focke-Wulf Fw 200 Condor sighted and attacked both cruisers only to be repelled by anti-aircraft gunfire. The German aircrew immediately turned north-east, reporting the position of the British cruisers more than half an hour later to Erdmenger. Captain Charles Clark on HMS Glasgow, assuming that he had been reported then also turned north-east, working around Erdmenger's position to intercept. The sea was becoming rougher and the wind had increased to 30 knots, making sailing difficult for the destroyers and torpedo boats.

Sailing into rough seas and gale force winds, Glasgow sighted the destroyers at 1332 hours at a range of 16 miles. The two cruisers then intercepted at full speed and altered course to cut the German ships off from their base.
Soon after Clarke gave the order for Glasgow to open fire with her 6-inch 'A' and 'B' turrets using her Type 273 radar for ranging. Enterprise opened fire a few minutes later. The two leading German destroyers however remained unscathed as shells splashed 100–150 metres from their targets. The Germans counter-attacked: Z23 launched six  torpedoes, three from each bank of tubes, when the range was down to 17,000 metres, but missed. Both destroyers also opened up with their 15 cm guns and their first shots fell only 200 metres over on Glasgow's port quarter. At about 1405 hours, a German shell hit Glasgow which exploded in 'A' boiler room, killing two members of the port pom-pom crew and wounding six others. Enterprise was continually straddled by near misses.

By 1418 hours both of the German flotillas were involved in the fight. The 4th Torpedo Boat Flotilla attempted to attack with torpedoes a number of times but was frustrated by the heavy seas. Z32 and Z37 turned towards the cruisers, and closing to 12,800 metres, launched six and four torpedoes respectively as the cruisers continued to give heavy and accurate fire. The torpedo attack forced Glasgow to make an emergency turn to port as the track of one torpedo passed no more than thirty metres from her port quarter and two more near the port side. Enterprise had by this time separated from Glasgow and both acted independently. After the torpedo attack, the destroyers laid smoke and then retired back towards the flotilla line. The formation was as follows: Z32, Z24, Z37, T23, T27, T26, T22, T25, Z27 and Z25 while Z32 and Z37 being off to port in the course of their torpedo attack.

The German force then split up, whereupon Glasgow reversed course at 1435 hours to chase the northerly group of destroyers; Enterprise had already altered course to the west to head them off. The Germans then launched another torpedo attack but shortly after Z27 had fired hers, she received a shell hit from Enterprise which struck the boiler room, passing through an oil bunker which caused a huge fire. Clouds of steam gushed from her forward funnel as her speed fell off. After being hit she fired her second salvo of four torpedoes, but all missed.

Glasgow meanwhile concentrated on T25, which soon after sustained hits in the region of the aft torpedo tubes, the Flakvierling and the 3.7 cm flak platforms, which killed or wounded all their crews. Then a second shell struck the German torpedo boat, which completely destroyed the mast as well as the funnel. T25 was now a sitting duck and requested T22 to attempt to come alongside and take off her crew. Glasgow shifted to T26, which was quickly bracketed by near misses. T22 had both cruisers on her port side, and, in an effort to drive them off while she closed in on her damaged consort, she fired her full spread of torpedoes and opened fire with her guns. The torpedoes passed harmlessly by their targets, and as T22 turned to starboard towards T25, she too was bracketed by near misses. T22 abandoned the rescue after suffering another hit, then laid smoke, fired her guns and withdrew to the south-west. T26 was still under fire and was soon severely hit in the boiler room, and as T22 laid smoke to screen her, the damaged ship signalled that she was sinking; T22 turned northwards and broke away.

The two cruisers reversed course, chasing and soon catching T26. Clarke ordered Enterprise to finish her off while he turned Glasgow north again to look for the other damaged German vessels, particularly T25. Glasgow soon came across not T25 but Z27, drifting and silent. Closing to point-blank range, Glasgow fired, hitting the destroyer's magazines. The hit caused a large explosion which killed Erdmenger, his staff and the captain. At the same time Enterprise finished off T26 with a single torpedo and then moved in for the kill on T25. The German ship's bridge and upper deck were a twist of metal and her after superstructure wrecked but she remained afloat. Enterprise closed to 3000 metres, firing her guns and then fired a torpedo; within minutes T25 was an abandoned, burning and sinking wreck.

Aftermath 
The two British cruisers met up once more and, seeing no further signs of the German squadron and having accounted for three of them at no significant damage to themselves, withdrew toward Plymouth. They arrived on the evening of 29 December, low on both fuel and ammunition. Glasgow had received one hit that killed two crew members and wounded another three, while Enterprise had no real damage except for shell splinters. The two German survivors, T22 and Z23, reunited and headed towards Saint-Jean-de-Luz near the Spanish border. The rest of the German ships headed back to the Gironde.

Of the 672 men on the three sunken ships, 93 were rescued from Z27, 100 from T25 and 90 from T26. British and Irish ships, Spanish destroyers and German U-boats took part in the rescue. Morale for the German Navy was lowered even further when news filtered through of the battleship Scharnhorst being sunk at the Battle of the North Cape, marking a sour note to the end of the year for the Kriegsmarine.

As it turned out, Osorno was the last of the blockade runners to get through. Three German blockade runners were sunk between 3 and 5 January 1944 by Allied patrols in the South Atlantic. The Germans thereafter ceased all surface blockade running and switched to movement by submarine, which became known as Yanagi missions.

References

Bibliography

External links 
 British PATHE: With The Navy – Bay Of Biscay

Conflicts in 1943
Battle of the Atlantic
Naval battles of World War II involving the United Kingdom
Naval battles of World War II involving Canada
Naval battles of World War II involving Germany
December 1943 events
Germany–United Kingdom military relations